Sufiyan Yousuf (born 28 June 1978) is a Pakistani politician who had been a member of the National Assembly of Pakistan, from 
2008 to May 2018.

Early life
He was born on 28 June 1978.

Political career
He was elected to the National Assembly of Pakistan as a candidate of Muttahida Qaumi Movement (MQM) from Constituency NA-246 (Karachi-VIII) in 2008 Pakistani general election. He received 186,933 votes and defeated Sohail Ansar, a candidate of Pakistan Peoples Party (PPP).

He was re-elected to the National Assembly as a candidate of MQM from Constituency NA-247 (Karachi-IX) in 2013 Pakistani general election. He received 126,263 votes and defeated Rashid Siddiqui, a candidate of Pakistan Tehreek-e-Insaf (PTI).

In 2016, he announced to resign from his National Assembly seat. However, as of February 2018, he remained a member of the legislature. MQM asked Election Commission of Pakistan to de-seat him.

References

Living people
Muttahida Qaumi Movement politicians
Pakistani MNAs 2013–2018
People from Karachi
Muttahida Qaumi Movement MNAs
1978 births
Pakistani MNAs 2008–2013